The Derelict is a short story by William Hope Hodgson, first published in 1912.

As he does in many of his stories, Hodgson employs a framework or "story within a story." In the framework, an elderly ship's doctor recounts a strange event that happened to him some years earlier, in the context of discussing his ideas about a fundamental life force that can manifest itself in the presence of proper materials.

While sailing as a passenger, a sudden storm disables the ship. In the aftermath, a derelict vessel is discovered. A small boat is sent to investigate, since from a distance the shape of the vessel seems to indicate that it is surprisingly ancient. The captain is interested in possible salvage.

Upon boarding the vessel, the investigators discover that it is encased in a thick fungus-like encrustation. In order to go below the deck, the captain kicks the encrustation, which begins to spurt a reddish fluid, and a rhythmic thudding like a heartbeat is heard. The solid surface of the encrustation begins softening and heaving, becoming mobile and gelatinous, and actually begins to dissolve the shoes of the investigators, as if it is attempting to digest them.

As events escalate, the lantern is dropped and extinguished; in the frantic attempt that follows to escape the vessel, a crewman is killed as he falls on the undulating surface and it envelopes and dissolves his body. The doctor and the captain manage to get over the side into an old lifeboat where they beat off a pseudopod and manage to escape back to their own vessel.

The doctor believes that the particular combination of cargo aboard the derelict, as it decayed, may have resulted in spontaneous generation of a new life form.

Adaptations
An audio dramatized version is available from Atlanta Radio Theatre Company.

External links

1912 short stories
Short stories by William Hope Hodgson
Horror short stories